Stephen Sommers (born March 20, 1962) is an American filmmaker, best known for big-budget action movies, such as The Mummy (1999), its sequel, The Mummy Returns (2001), Van Helsing (2004), and G.I. Joe: The Rise of Cobra (2009). He also directed The Adventures of Huck Finn (1993), Disney's live action version of Rudyard Kipling's The Jungle Book (1994) and the cult classic horror film Deep Rising (1998).

Early life
Stephen Sommers was born in Indianapolis, and grew up in St. Cloud, Minnesota, where he attended St. Cloud Apollo High School. He is a 1980 graduate of Saint John's University in Collegeville, Minnesota, and the University of Seville in Spain. After graduating, he spent four years performing as an actor in theater groups and managing rock bands throughout Europe. He eventually returned to the United States and moved to Los Angeles, where he attended the USC School of Cinematic Arts for three years, earning a master's degree and writing and directing the award-winning short film Perfect Alibi.

Career
Perfect Alibi helped Sommers acquire independent funding to write and direct his first feature film, the teen racing film Catch Me If You Can, filmed for $800,000 on location in his hometown of St. Cloud. The film was sold at the Cannes Film Festival for $7 million and later debuted on video in the United States.

Almost four years later, broke and in danger of having his house repossessed, he wrote and directed an adaptation of Mark Twain's classic The Adventures of Huck Finn for Walt Disney Pictures, as well as Rudyard Kipling's The Jungle Book. He later wrote the screenplays for Gunmen and Tom and Huck, which he also executive produced for Disney (along with a TV version of Oliver Twist in 1997 starring Richard Dreyfuss and Elijah Wood), and worked as a staff writer at Hollywood Pictures. While there, he worked on a script called Tentacle, which he later directed under the title Deep Rising in 1998.

In 1999, he wrote and directed Universal Studios' big-budget remake of The Mummy. The film was a smash hit, and Sommers received two Saturn Awards nominations for Best Director and Best Writer in 2000 by the Academy of Science Fiction, Fantasy & Horror Films. A successful sequel, The Mummy Returns, followed two years later, and he also co-wrote and produced 2002's The Scorpion King, a prequel/spin-off of The Mummy Returns.

In 2004, Sommers founded his own company (along with editor/producing partner Bob Ducsay), The Sommers Company, and returned to theater screens with Van Helsing, a film pitting legendary vampire hunter Gabriel Van Helsing against the triumvirate of Universal movie monsters: Count Dracula, The Wolf Man, and Frankenstein's monster. Before Van Helsing even premiered, Sommers and Ducsay began developing a spin-off TV series for NBC called Transylvania. Though featuring none of the characters from the film, the series (which was to have made use of the film's Prague set) was about a young cowboy from Texas who becomes a sheriff in Transylvania, has many strange adventures, and encounters many strange creatures. Sommers and Ducsay were to have been executive producers, and Sommers wrote scripts for the pilot and first several episodes, but NBC decided not to go through with the show.

Since Van Helsing, Sommers has been attached to a number of projects. He was originally set to direct Night at the Museum, but dropped out due to creative differences. He was also attached to a remake of When Worlds Collide (to be executive produced by Steven Spielberg), a new big-screen adaptation of Flash Gordon, a swashbuckling adventure film called Airborn based on the novel Airborn, a romantic/adventure story called Big Love, and a remake of the French film Les Victimes. Sommers opted out of directing the third Mummy film, titled The Mummy: Tomb of the Dragon Emperor, instead becoming one of its producers.

Sommers directed Paramount Pictures' summer 2009 live-action adaptation of G.I. Joe: The Rise of Cobra, and also served as a producer. Around that time, he was developing a Tarzan adaptation for Warner Bros. but left the project. His most recent film, Odd Thomas, had been delayed from release due to lawsuits against the production company, but was eventually released.

Filmography

Films

TV series

Accolades

References

External links

 
 

1962 births
20th-century American male writers
21st-century American male writers
Action film directors
American male screenwriters
College of Saint Benedict and Saint John's University alumni
Film directors from Indiana
Film directors from Los Angeles
Film directors from Minnesota
Film producers from California
Film producers from Indiana
Film producers from Minnesota
Horror film directors
Living people
Screenwriters from California
Screenwriters from Indiana
Screenwriters from Minnesota
University of Seville alumni
USC School of Cinematic Arts alumni
Writers from Indianapolis